Bhakta Kuchela may refer to:

 Bhakta Kuchela (1961 film), a 1961 Malayalam film directed by P. Subramaniam
 Bhaktha Kuchela (1936 film), a Tamil-language film directed by K. Subramaniam